Hursh is an unincorporated community in Cedar Creek Township, Allen County, in the U.S. state of Indiana.

History
Hursh was originally platted as the Town of Urbanna in 1867.  A post office was established at Hursh in 1882, and remained in operation until 1903. The community was named after the Hursh family of settlers.

Geography

References

Unincorporated communities in Allen County, Indiana
Unincorporated communities in Indiana
Fort Wayne, IN Metropolitan Statistical Area